Fannin County is a county in the far northeast of the U.S. state of Texas, on the border with Oklahoma. As of the 2020 census, its population was 35,662. The county seat is Bonham.

The county was named for James Fannin, who commanded the group of Texans killed in the Goliad Massacre during the Texas Revolution. James Bonham (the county seat's namesake) sought Fannin's assistance for the Battle of the Alamo, but Fannin was unable to provide it.

The county was created in 1837 and organized the next year. Fannin County is a part of the Texoma region.

Geography
It is drained by Bois D'Arc Creek and Sulphur River.

Major highways
  U.S. Highway 69
  U.S. Highway 82
  State Highway 11
  State Highway 34
  State Highway 50
  State Highway 56
  State Highway 78
  State Highway 121

Adjacent counties
 Bryan County, Oklahoma (north)
 Lamar County (east)
 Delta County (southeast)
 Hunt County (south)
 Collin County (southwest)
 Grayson County (west)

National protected area
 Caddo National Grassland

Demographics

Note: the US Census treats Hispanic/Latino as an ethnic category. This table excludes Latinos from the racial categories and assigns them to a separate category. Hispanics/Latinos can be of any race.

As of the census of 2000, 31,242 people, 11,105 households, and 7,984 were families residing in the county.  The population density was 35 people per square mile (14/km2). The 12,887 housing units averaged 14 per square mile (6/km2). The racial makeup of the county was 86.56% White, 7.96% African American, 0.92% Native American, 0.26% Asian, 2.81% from other races, and 1.49% from two or more races.  About 5.61% of the population was Hispanic or Latino of any race. As of 2015, the largest self-reported ancestry groups were 48.50% English, 16.10% Welsh, 11.00% German, and 7.25% Irish.

Of the 11,105 households, 31.10% had children under the age of 18 living with them, 57.90% were married couples living together, 10.30% had a female householder with no husband present, and 28.10% were not families. About 25.20% of all households were made up of individuals, and 12.70% had someone living alone who was 65 years of age or older.  The average household size was 2.51, and the average family size was 2.99.

In the county, the population was distributed as 23.20% under the age of 18, 8.90% from 18 to 24, 28.60% from 25 to 44, 23.20% from 45 to 64, and 16.10% who were 65 years of age or older.  The median age was 38 years. For every 100 females, there were 113.80 males.  For every 100 females age 18 and over, there were 116.90 males.

The median income for a household in the county was $34,501, and for a family was $42,193. Males had a median income of $31,140 versus $23,101 for females. The per capita income for the county was $16,066.  About 9.90% of families and 13.90% of the population were below the poverty line, including 17.70% of those under age 18 and 16.50% of those age 65 or over.

Communities

Cities

 Bailey
 Bonham (county seat)
 Ector
 Honey Grove
 Leonard
 Pecan Gap (mostly in Delta County)
 Ravenna
 Savoy
 Trenton (small part in Grayson County)

Towns
 Dodd City
 Ladonia
 Whitewright (mostly in Grayson County)
 Windom

Unincorporated communities

 Bug Tussle
 Duplex
 Elwood
 Gober
 Hilger
 Ivanhoe
 Mulberry
 Randolph
 Telephone
 Warren

Politics
Once a Democratic stronghold for decades, Fannin County has shifted heavily toward the Republican Party since the 1990s. As a sign of this trend, Republican candidates for President have won an ever-increasing share of the vote in each of the seven presidential elections, starting in 1996.

See also

 National Register of Historic Places listings in Fannin County, Texas
 Recorded Texas Historic Landmarks in Fannin County

References

External links

 Fannin County government's website
 

 
1838 establishments in the Republic of Texas
Populated places established in 1838